Poole Brothers was a publishing company founded in 1870 by George Amos and William H. Poole. George was previously a co-founder of Rand, McNally & Co. in 1868 and served as its first treasurer. He then left the organization to form Poole Brothers with William. The company was the largest printing house in the country that catered to transportation companies. According to The Inland Printer, "practically every railroad in the country" used Poole Brothers materials. Poole Brothers later expanded to print periodicals, including Advertising Age and the New England Journal of Medicine.

See also
George Amos Poole, founder
George Amos Poole III, grandson of the founder and collector

References

1870 establishments in Illinois
Book publishing companies based in Illinois
Defunct book publishing companies of the United States
Defunct companies based in Chicago